Lower Defsko Lake is a large mountain lake in Kosovo. Lower Defsko Lake is located in the Kosovan side of the Šar Mountains under the slopes of the Vraca mountain. It is very near the origin of the Radika river which originates in Kosovo.

See also 
Upper Defsko Lake

Notes

References 

Lakes of Kosovo
Lakes of Serbia
Šar Mountains